Edward Buckton Lamb (1806–1869) was a British architect who exhibited at the Royal Academy from 1824. Lamb was labelled a 'Rogue Gothic Revivalist', and his designs were roundly criticised for breaking with convention,  especially by The Ecclesiologist. More recently Nikolaus Pevsner called him "the most original though certainly not the most accomplished architect of his day".

Life

He was born in London, England, his father James Lamb being a government official. He was articled to Lewis Nockalls Cottingham.

He was selected to design the chapel for the Brompton Hospital, then being built to the designs of Frederick John Francis, and was retained to complete the main building, in collaboration with Francis.

He contributed to Loudon's Encyclopaedia (1833), published studies on Gothic Ornament (1830), Ancient Domestic Architecture (1846) with text by William Henry Leeds, and contributed regularly to the Architectural Magazine (1834–8).

He died in the summer of 1869 and was buried on the western side of Highgate Cemetery.

Buildings
Notable buildings he was responsible for include:
Brompton Hospital Chapel, London, and in collaboration with F.J. Francis, parts of the main Hospital building. 
All Saints' Church, Hartlepool
St Stephen's church, Aldwark, Yorkshire (1846–53)
St Luke's Chapel, Brompton Hospital (1849)
St Margaret's, Leiston, Suffolk (1853)
Christ Church, Hartlepool (1854)
Berkhamsted Town Hall
Episcopal Church, Dumfries
Eye Town Hall
Hrádek u Nechanic
Disraeli Monument, Hughenden, Buckinghamshire (1862).
St Martin's Church, Gospel Oak, London (consecrated 1865)
St Mary Magdalene Church, Addiscombe (1868–70)
Hughenden Manor, alterations for Benjamin Disraeli
Wadhurst Castle
St. Ninian's Episcopal Church, Castle Douglas, Scotland
Carnsalloch Chapel at The Mount, Kirkton, Dumfries

Gallery

Publications
Etchings of Gothic Ornament 1830

References

Notes

External links

. 

1806 births
1869 deaths
Burials at Highgate Cemetery
Architects from London
Gothic Revival architects
English architecture writers
Writers from London
19th-century English architects